James Gordon Black (8 July 1931 – 29 November 2018) was a Scottish footballer who played for Hibernian, Falkirk, Dundee, St Johnstone and Dumbarton.

Black died in Livingston, West Lothian on 29 November 2018, at the age of 87.

References

1931 births
2018 deaths
Scottish footballers
Hibernian F.C. players
Falkirk F.C. players
Dundee F.C. players
St Johnstone F.C. players
Dumbarton F.C. players
Scottish Football League players
Association football wing halves
People from Linlithgow